Maui is the second-largest of the Hawaiian Islands.

Maui may also refer to:

Geography
 Maui County, Hawaii, consisting of Maui and surrounding islands
 Maui gas field, natural gas field off the coast of New Zealand
 Te Ika-a-Māui (the fish of Māui), Māori name for the North Island of New Zealand

Mythology
 Māui (mythology), hero in Polynesian mythology.  Specific culture articles:
 Māui (Hawaiian mythology)
 Maui (Mangarevan mythology)
 Māui (Māori mythology)
 Ti'iti'i (Samoan mythology), equivalent to Maui elsewhere in Polynesia
 Maui (Tahitian mythology)
 Maui (Tongan mythology)
 See also
 Maui, a character from the 2016 Disney film Moana, based on the mythological figure

People
 Prince Maui of Silla (fl. 10th century), the last prince of the Korean kingdom of Silla
 Māui (Christian convert) (early New Zealand Māori Christian, died 1816)
 Māui Pōmare, early 20th century New Zealand politician

Technology
.NET MAUI, .NET Multi-platform App UI
MAUI, a feature-phone operating system used with MediaTek-based shanzhai devices, also used on Motorola phones and some Samsung feature phones. 
USS Maui, the name of more than one United States Navy ship
Maui Cluster Scheduler, a tool to manage job allocation on computer clusters in high performance computing

Companies
 Maui Jim, sunglasses producer

Other
 Maui's dolphin (Cephalorhynchus hectori maui), worlds rarest marine dolphin